The J. Willis Ambrose Medal is an award presented by the Geological Association of Canada, and is named after the association's first President, J. Willis Ambrose. It is awarded annually, unless no suitable candidate is identified, "to an individual for sustained dedicated service to the Canadian earth science community."

Recipients 
Source: Geological Association of Canada

See also

 List of geology awards

References

Canadian science and technology awards
Geology awards
Awards established in 1986